Chang Feng-hsu (5 August 1928 – 1 June 2014) was a Taiwanese politician.

Born in Pingtung County, he served on the Taiwan Provincial Council before becoming the  Pingtung County Magistrate in 1964. He was elected Mayor of Taipei in 1972, but served concurrently as county magistrate until 1973. In 1976, Chang was appointed Minister of the Interior, and stepped down in 1978. He later served as chairman of the Chinese Taipei Olympic Committee from 1987 to 1998.

He died in 2014, aged 85, at Taipei Veterans General Hospital.

References

1928 births
2014 deaths
Magistrates of Pingtung County
Mayors of Taipei
Kuomintang politicians in Taiwan
Taiwanese Ministers of the Interior